Martin Anthony Lunde (born September 20, 1958), better known by the ring name Arn Anderson, is an American professional wrestling road agent, author, and retired professional wrestler. He is currently signed to All Elite Wrestling (AEW) as a manager. Although he is widely regarded as one of the finest tag team wrestlers in history, he also had a successful singles career and became a four-time NWA/WCW World Television Champion, which he often called his "world title".

Anderson's career was highlighted by his alliances with Ric Flair and various members of the wrestling stable The Four Horsemen in the National Wrestling Alliance (NWA) and World Championship Wrestling (WCW). After his retirement, he worked as a producer for WWE until 2019, when he joined AEW. On March 31, 2012, Anderson was inducted into the WWE Hall of Fame as a member of the Four Horsemen. His son, Brock Anderson also pursued a career in professional wrestling, performing for AEW.

Early life 
Martin Anthony Lunde was born in Rome, Georgia, on September 20, 1958.

Professional wrestling career

Early career (1982–1984) 
Lunde began his career on January 2, 1982 in Georgia Championship Wrestling going by the ring name Jim Vertaroso, having been trained by Ted Lipscomb (Allen). He spent much of the year wrestling in various independent wrestling companies across the United States, including a minor run in Mid South Wrestling for Bill Watts from 1982 to 1983. By the middle of 1983, he made his way to Southeastern Championship Wrestling, an NWA affiliated promotion operating out of Tennessee and Alabama. Taking the name of "Super Olympia", Lunde soon became a member of Ron Fuller's Stud Stable before the year was out. Lunde saw success in the tag team ranks by winning the NWA Southeastern Tag Team Championship three times with Mr. Olympia and once with Pat Rose throughout 1984. It was also here in this promotion that Lunde met and began what would become a lifelong friendship with Ric Flair. By the end of the year, however, Lunde left the company and joined Mid South Wrestling based out of Shreveport. Lunde's time in Mid South was coming to an end, and during a TV taping the Junk Yard Dog mentioned to Bill Watts, the owner of Mid South Wrestling, that Lunde looked like an Anderson. Watts called Jim Crockett and convinced him to book Lunde.

Jim Crockett Promotions / World Championship Wrestling (1984–1988)

Minnesota Wrecking Crew (1984–1985) 

Lunde made his way to Jim Crockett, Jr.'s Mid-Atlantic Championship Wrestling, based in the Virginias and the Carolinas. By this time, the company extended its range into Georgia after rival promoter Vince McMahon purchased Georgia Championship Wrestling. There was a strong physical resemblance between Lunde and Ole Anderson, who had achieved legendary status in the Georgia and Mid-Atlantic territories as a tag team wrestler. Ole noticed that Lunde's style was a no nonsense approach in the ring and specialized in working over a part of an opponent's body throughout the match, much like Ole himself. Anderson agreed to work with Lunde, helping to hone his capabilities, and re-formed the Minnesota Wrecking Crew with Lunde replacing Gene Anderson and taking on the name of "Arn Anderson", Ole's kayfabe nephew. The team quickly became a force in the territory by capturing the NWA National Tag Team Championship in March 1985. Arn and Ole defended the titles throughout the year, with their highest profile match being part of the card for Starrcade 1985 on Thanksgiving night. The Crew successfully defended the titles against Wahoo McDaniel and Billy Jack Haynes.

The Four Horsemen (1985–1988) 

In the latter half of 1985, the Andersons formed a loose knit alliance with fellow heels Tully Blanchard and Ric Flair, as they began to have common enemies. The foursome frequently teamed together in six-man, and sometimes, eight-man tag matches or interfered in each other's matches to help score a victory or, at least, to prevent each other from losing their titles. The alliance quickly became a force within the territory, working in feuds against some of the biggest stars in the company like Dusty Rhodes, Magnum T. A., The Road Warriors and the Rock 'n' Roll Express. Anderson also saw success as a singles wrestler on January 4, 1986, by winning the vacant NWA Television Championship. Simultaneously, Anderson was still one half of the NWA National Tag Team Champions and, even though Crockett promotions abandoned the National Tag titles in March, Anderson's success as a dual champion elevated his status within the territory. It was also during this time (in 1986) that the Andersons, Blanchard, and Flair began calling themselves The Four Horsemen with J. J. Dillon serving as the group's manager. Anderson also had a tremendous ability to do interviews to further the storylines he participated in. His ability to improvise in interviews allowed him to coin the "Four Horsemen" moniker for the stable, as he likened their coming to wrestle at an event and the aftermath of their wrath as being akin to the Four Horsemen of the Apocalypse, and the name stuck. Anderson continued his reign as NWA Television Champion for most of the year, holding the championship for just over 9 months before losing it to Dusty Rhodes on September 9, 1986.

The first real setback with the Horsemen occurred at Starrcade 1986 after Anderson and Ole lost a Steel Cage match to The Rock 'n' Roll Express, with Ole getting pinned. The subsequent storyline positioned Ole as the weak link within the team, possibly attributed to his age. Ole's position with the group was only further weakened after he decided to take two months off after Starrcade. After Ole's return in February 1987, the other Horsemen turned on him and threw him out of the group, resulting in Ole incurring numerous attacks over the next several months. Afterwards, Ole was replaced with Lex Luger and the Horsemen resumed their dominance of the company.

As a member of the Horsemen, Anderson continued to be involved in high-profile angles within the company. By mid-1987, Anderson and fellow Horsemen Tully Blanchard began regularly competing as a tag team and rose quickly through the tag team ranks. The duo faced the Rock 'n' Roll Express for the NWA World Tag Team Championship on September 29, 1987, and were victorious. This win further solidified the group's dominance in the company as Lex Luger was the reigning NWA United States Heavyweight Champion and Ric Flair spent most of 1987 as the NWA World Heavyweight Champion, losing it to Ron Garvin in September, only to regain it at Starrcade 1987 on Thanksgiving night. Anderson and Tully continued to feud throughout the rest of the year and first few months of 1988 with the Road Warriors, the Rock 'n' Roll Express and the Midnight Express being their most frequent rivals.

By December 1987, Luger had defected from the Horsemen and began a heated feud with the group, with Ric Flair especially. In early 1988, Luger formed a tag team with Barry Windham and began challenging Anderson and Blanchard for the NWA World Tag Team Championship. The bigger, stronger team of Windham and Luger were eventually successful, winning the titles on March 27, 1988. The reign would be short lived, however, as Anderson and Blanchard regained the titles less than a month later after Barry Windham turned on Luger during their match and joined the Horsemen. Though Anderson and Blanchard were two of the biggest stars in Crockett's company, they were frequently in dispute with Crockett over their pay. Despite the fact that the two, along with the Horsemen, were helping to generate millions of dollars in revenue for the company, they considered themselves to be underpaid. Their last contracted match with the company took place on September 10, 1988, when they dropped the NWA World Tag Team Championship to the Midnight Express before leaving for the WWF.

World Wrestling Federation (1988–1989) 

Anderson and Blanchard left Crockett's company to join Vince McMahon's World Wrestling Federation. Upon being named the Brain Busters, the team took Bobby "The Brain" Heenan as their manager and quickly began rising through the tag team ranks, eventually coming to challenge Demolition for the WWF Tag Team Championship. On July 18, 1989, the Brain Busters won the titles, ending Demolition's historic reign of 478 days; the match would air on the July 29 edition of Saturday Night's Main Event XXII. Although they would lose the titles back to Demolition on an episode of WWF Superstars just over three months later, the Brain Busters continued to be a force in the WWF's tag team division.

World Championship Wrestling (1989–2001)

World Television Champion (1990–1991) 

In December 1989, Anderson left the WWF and went back to WCW. Blanchard was slated to return as well but WWF accused him of testing positive for cocaine. Crockett's company was now called World Championship Wrestling and was under the ownership of billionaire mogul Ted Turner. Anderson helped to reform the Horsemen and he quickly found success in the company, winning the NWA World Television Championship on January 2, 1990. Anderson remained the champion almost the entire year before dropping it to Tom Zenk. Zenk's reign would be short lived, however, as Anderson regained the title, having been renamed the WCW World Television Championship on January 14, 1991. His third reign with the title was also considered successful as he held the title a little more than five months before dropping it to "Beautiful" Bobby Eaton on May 19, 1991. Afterwards, with Horsemen members Ric Flair and Sid Vicious gone to the WWF and Barry Windham having turned face, Anderson entered the tag team ranks of WCW.

World Tag Team Champion (1991–1992) 

In the summer of 1991, Anderson formed a tag team with Larry Zbyszko and they called themselves the Enforcers. After competing for several months and moving up in the tag team ranks, they successfully captured the WCW World Tag Team Championship on September 2, 1991. The reign would be short lived, however, as they lost the titles roughly two and a half months later to Ricky Steamboat and Dustin Rhodes. Anderson and Zbyszko wrestled their final match as a tag team in December 1991 as part of WCW's "Roar Power" tour of Europe. 

Later in December 1991, Anderson joined Paul E. Dangerously's new stable the Dangerous Alliance, where he formed a new tag team with "Beautiful" Bobby Eaton. They quickly moved up the tag team division and were soon a threat to Steamboat and Rhodes. Anderson and Eaton quickly won the titles on January 16, 1992, and defended the titles against all comers for the next four and a half months before losing the titles to the Steiner Brothers in May 1992. The Dangerous Alliance disbanded in November 1992 following Clash of the Champions XXI, following which Anderson took a short hiatus from WCW.

The Four Horsemen reunion (1993)

While still under WCW contract, Anderson wrestled a handful of matches for Smoky Mountain Wrestling in March and April 1993, teaming with the Rock 'n' Roll Express. At Slamboree '93: A Legends' Reunion in May 1993, Anderson unsuccessfully challenged Barry Windham for the NWA World Heavyweight Championship.

In May 1993, Anderson joined Ole Anderson and Ric Flair to once more reform the Four Horsemen. The Horsemen introduced Paul Roma as their newest member. Although athletic and a skilled in-ring competitor, Roma had spent much of his career as a jobber in the WWF. As part of an interview segment for the Ric Flair and the Four Horsemen DVD, Triple H stated that he thought the addition of Roma made the membership the weakest in the history of the group, and Arn himself referred to Roma as "a glorified gym rat". Although Anderson and Roma won the WCW World Tag Team Championship in August, the group was seen as a failure by WCW. The stable disbanded in October 1993 after Anderson was legitimately injured in an altercation with Sid Vicious.

Anderson returned to the ring in December 1993, facing his former stablemate Paul Roma in a series of matches. In February 1994, he formed a short-lived tag team with Ricky Steamboat. In May 1994, Anderson wrestled at the Eastern Championship Wrestling event When Worlds Collide as part of a talent exchange between WCW and ECW. At the event, Anderson teamed with Terry Funk in an unsuccessful challenge to Sabu and Bobby Eaton.

Stud Stable; World Television Champion (1994–1995) 

In May 1994, Anderson formed another new tag team, this one with Dustin Rhodes. At Bash at the Beach 1994, Anderson and Rhodes faced Col. Rob Parker's Stud Stable; during the match, Anderson betrayed Rhodes and cost him them match, subsequently joining the Stud Stable alongside Terry Funk, Bunkhouse Buck, "Stunning" Steve Austin and Meng. The Stud Stable feuded with Dusty and Dustin Rhodes until late 1994 when Funk left.

Anderson's last championship run began on January 8, 1995, after winning the World Television Championship from Johnny B. Badd. Anderson helped restore the prestige of the title, which he held for just over six months before dropping it to The Renegade at Great American Bash 1995. He briefly feuded with long-time friend Flair, and was assisted by Brian Pillman in his efforts.

The Four Horsemen reunion (1995–1997) 

In 1995, Anderson reformed the Four Horsemen yet again with Flair, Anderson, Pillman, and a partner to be named later (who ended up being Chris Benoit).

By the end of 1996, Anderson rarely competed in the ring as years of wear and tear on his body finally started to catch up with him. On the November 25 edition of Nitro, Anderson fought Luger to a double count-out in a quarter-final tournament match for the vacant WCW United States Championship.

Semi-retirement (1997–2001) 
On the August 25, 1997, episode of Monday Nitro, Anderson formally announced his retirement from the ring. While standing in the ring, surrounded by Ric Flair and newest Horsemen members Steve McMichael and Benoit, Anderson declared that his last official act as the "Enforcer" for the Four Horsemen was to offer his "spot" in the group to Curt Hennig, as he was forced to retire due to extensive neck and upper back injuries. He worked a couple tag matches afterward, including teaming with David Flair on an episode of WCW Thunder, but his physical involvement was extremely limited in those bouts.

On the September 14, 1998, edition of Nitro, alongside Steve McMichael, Dean Malenko, and Chris Benoit, Anderson ceremoniously reintroduced Ric Flair to WCW after his 12-month hiatus. In doing so, they reformed the Horsemen who then feuded with WCW President Eric Bischoff. Flair won the presidency of WCW from Bischoff on the December 28, 1998, episode of Nitro followed by winning the WCW World Heavyweight Championship at Uncensored 1999 and turn heel in the process. Anderson remained Flair's right-hand man during this time as he attempted to keep Flair's delusional hunger for power at bay.

In 2000, Anderson was a member of the short-lived Old Age Outlaws. Led by Terry Funk, the group of veteran wrestlers battled the revived New World Order. On May 9, Anderson wrestled in two matches losing to David Flair and a week later teaming with Ric to defeat David Flair and Crowbar.

WCW was purchased by the World Wrestling Federation in 2001, ending Anderson's tenure there.

World Wrestling Federation / World Wrestling Entertainment / WWE (2001–2019) 

Not long after the closing of WCW, Anderson became a road agent for WWF, renamed World Wrestling Entertainment (WWE) in May 2002. He occasionally appeared on WWE television trying to, with the help of other WWE management, pull apart (kayfabe) backstage brawls. Before the WCW/ECW Invasion storyline, Anderson took up color commentary for a WCW World Heavyweight Championship match between Booker T and Buff Bagwell, WCW Cruiserweight Championship match with Billy Kidman and Gregory Helms as well as another WCW Championship match between Diamond Dallas Page and Booker T, which would be his only appearances as a commentator in WWE. He made an appearance on Raw in 2002 delivering a video to Triple H before he was supposed to renew his wedding vows to then-heel, Stephanie McMahon. Anderson was also assaulted on Raw by The Undertaker leading up the Undertaker vs. then-babyface, Ric Flair match at WrestleMania X8. During that bout, Anderson made a brief in-ring appearance, delivering his signature spinebuster to The Undertaker. He would later turn heel once again by helping Ric Flair in his feud with Stone Cold Steve Austin, leading to Austin (kayfabe) urinating on him. Several months later he became a face once again and attempted to help a then-babyface Flair gain (kayfabe) sole ownership of WWE during a match with Vince McMahon, but backed down from a confrontation with Brock Lesnar, who entered the ring to assist McMahon.

Anderson made a special appearance at the October 2006 Raw Family Reunion special, in which he was in Ric Flair's corner for his match against Mitch of the Spirit Squad. Anderson was in the corner of Flair, Sgt. Slaughter, Dusty Rhodes, and Ron Simmons at Survivor Series 2006, where the four faced the Spirit Squad, but was ejected from the arena during the match. On the March 31, 2008 Raw, Anderson came out to say his final goodbye to Ric Flair and thank him for his career. At No Mercy, he was backstage congratulating Triple H for retaining the WWE Championship against Jeff Hardy.

On an episode of Smackdown Live in August 2016, Anderson made an appearance as one of the people asked by Heath Slater to be his tag team partner for the tournament to determine the inaugural winners of the WWE SmackDown Tag Team Championship. Anderson refused to help Slater upon learning that he was not Slater's first choice as a tag team partner. On the August 8, 2017, episode of Smackdown Live, Anderson made a guest appearance on Fashion Police, revealing himself to be the one who destroyed Breezango's toy horse, Tully, and boasting he was the best horse from the Four Horsemen, and that "Tully" should have been named "Arn".

On February 22, 2019, it was reported Anderson had been released from the WWE. It was later reported this was due to Anderson allowing an intoxicated Alicia Fox to wrestle a match at a WWE Live Event on February 10. At Starcast II, Anderson spoke briefly about his release saying he didn't want to be somewhere he was not wanted and the hours had become too much for him. He couldn't say much due to being bound by a non-disclosure agreement.

All Elite Wrestling (2019–present) 
On August 31, 2019, Anderson made a surprise appearance at the All Elite Wrestling (AEW) pay-per-view event, All Out, assisting Cody in his match against Shawn Spears by hitting Spears with a spinebuster. On November 6, 2019, Anderson would be a guest commentator on AEW Dark.

On December 30, 2019, AEW announced that Arn Anderson had signed a contract with the company as Cody's personal advisor and head coach. He would make his AEW Dynamite debut on the January 1, 2020, episode, assisting Cody to win his match against Darby Allin. On June 3, 2020, Anderson announced that he had signed a new multi-year contract with AEW.

On the June 11, 2021 episode of Dynamite, in an interview with Tony Schiavone, Anderson (alongside his son Brock and Cody Rhodes) announced that Brock would be wrestling with AEW and would join the Nightmare Family. The interview was interrupted by QT Marshall and a fight ensued. On the June 18 episode of Dynamite, Anderson accompanied Brock to the ring for his debut match. Brock, teaming with Cody Rhodes defeated QT Marshall & Aaron Solow. After the match Anderson hugged Brock and raised his hand.

On the September 29 episode of Dynamite, Anderson dumped Rhodes, who was on a losing streak, and left the ring with Lee Johnson, who had just successfully scored a winning pinfall while teaming with Rhodes. During the promo when he dumped Rhodes, Anderson (a real-life gun enthusiast) told him that Rhodes would allow a carjacker to steal his car while Anderson would "pull out the Glock, put it on his forehead, and spill his brains all over the concrete". The promo, which received approval in advance from both Tony Khan and TNT, received universal critical praise from fans and other wrestlers, as the quote got Anderson trending on Twitter; AEW promptly released a T-shirt featuring the quote due to the reaction. However, Anderson would afterwards resume coaching Rhodes, who would later go on to have another reign as AEW TNT Champion.

Personal life
Although he was billed as such at various times, Anderson is not related to the Anderson family or Ric Flair. He was given the "Anderson" name and was originally billed as Ole Anderson's brother, and then later billed as Ole's nephew, because of his resemblance to Ole in appearance and wrestling style. He was also billed as Flair's cousin. Flair is not related to any of the Andersons, but he is a longtime friend of Anderson.

Anderson married Erin Lunde in 1985. They reside in Charlotte, North Carolina, and have two sons named Brock and Barrett. Brock followed in his father's footsteps and became a professional wrestler. Anderson stated on an episode of his podcast The Arn Show that the only reason he had stayed in the business for so long was to make sure Brock was able to get his start in it.

During a WCW tour of Europe, Anderson and Sid Eudy (better known as Sid Vicious or Sycho Sid) were involved in an argument at a hotel bar in the English town of Blackburn on October 27, 1993. Anderson threatened Eudy with a broken bottle; after being sent to their rooms by security chief Doug Dillinger, Eudy later came to Anderson's room and attacked him with a chair leg, and Anderson retaliated with pair of scissors. Eudy received four stab wounds and Anderson received 20, losing a pint and a half of blood in the process. The fight was broken up by fellow wrestler 2 Cold Scorpio, who was credited with saving Anderson's life. Neither man pressed charges against the other, and British police declined to do so since both men would soon be leaving the country. Eudy was later fired over the incident.

As stated in his biography, Anderson was thrown into the ring ropes during a match in 1994. The top rope broke from the turnbuckle, but he was able to land on his feet. Six months later, the same event happened again, but this time he landed full-force on to the concrete and hit his head, neck, and upper back. He never took time off to heal. As time passed, with no down time, the injuries worsened. In his biography, Anderson states that the first sign of problems was his left arm suddenly going numb and unresponsive during a match. Doctors found that a rib, possibly torn away from the spine during the accident, was popping in and out of the joint and causing shoulder discomfort and weakness. Upon seeing his chiropractor in Charlotte, North Carolina, and consulting medical experts in Atlanta, Georgia, the damage to Anderson's body was found to be much more severe than previously thought and surgery was deemed the only option to keep his left arm functioning at all. Surgery occurred in Atlanta in late 1996 (resulting in a left posterior laminectomy of the 3rd, 4th, and 5th cervical bones and a fusion of the 7th cervical and 1st thoracic bones) and was successful in repairing most of the damage, but Anderson still has some muscle weakness, loss of fine motor control, and loss of muscle mass in his left arm. He spent many weeks in the hospital during that time, crediting his recovery to his wife, his physical therapist, and the fact he did not want his children to be fatherless. He would be readmitted in March 1997 with symptoms akin to cardiac arrest and pulmonary failure, but was released soon afterwards.

On March 11, 2023, Anderson announced on Twitter that his son Barrett had passed away the night before at age 37.

Other media
Anderson's autobiography, Arn Anderson 4 Ever, was released on April 30, 2000.

Anderson has appeared in the video games WWE Legends of WrestleMania, WWE '12, WWE 2K16 (as DLC), and WWE 2K17 as a member of The Enforcers with Larry Zbyszko.

Anderson's podcast, The Arn Show with Conrad Thompson (and hosted by Paul Bromwell since 2021), debuted in 2019.

Anderson appeared on the reality show Rhodes to the Top.

Championships and accomplishments
Cauliflower Alley Club
Art Abrams Lifetime Achievement/Lou Thesz Award (2016)
Jim Crockett Promotions / World Championship Wrestling
NWA/WCW World Television Championship (4 times)
 NWA World Tag Team Championship (1 time) – with Paul Roma
NWA National Tag Team Championship (1 time) – with Ole Anderson
NWA (Mid-Atlantic)/WCW World Tag Team Championship (5 times) – with Tully Blanchard (2), Larry Zbyszko (1), Bobby Eaton (1), and Paul Roma (1)
Pro Wrestling Illustrated
Ranked No. 9 of the 500 best wrestlers in the PWI 500 in 1991
PWI Feud of the Year (1987) –  Four Horsemen vs. The Super Powers and The Road Warriors
PWI Tag Team of the Year (1989) –  with Tully Blanchard
PWI Tag Team of the Year (1991) –  with Larry Zbyszko
PWI Stanley Weston Award (1997)
Ranked No. 62 of the top 500 singles wrestlers of the "PWI Years" in 2003
Southeastern Championship Wrestling
NWA Southeastern Tag Team Championship (4 times) – with Jerry Stubbs (3) and Pat Rose (1)
Southern States Wrestling
Kingsport Wrestling Hall of Fame (Class of 2001)
World Wrestling Federation / World Wrestling Entertainment
WWF Tag Team Championship (1 time) – with Tully Blanchard
WWE Hall of Fame (Class of 2012) as a member of The Four Horsemen
Wrestling Observer Newsletter
Best on Interviews (1990)
Worst Worked Match of the Year (1996) –  with Ric Flair, Meng, The Barbarian, Lex Luger, Kevin Sullivan, Z-Gangsta, and The Ultimate Solution vs. Hulk Hogan and Randy Savage in a  Towers of Doom match at Uncensored

References

Further reading
Autobiography: Anderson, Arn. Arn Anderson 4 Ever: A Look Behind the Curtain. Kayfabe Pub Group, 1998

External links

ARN on Westwood One Podcast Network
Arn Anderson Tribute Site

1958 births
20th-century professional wrestlers
All Elite Wrestling personnel
American color commentators
American male professional wrestlers
American podcasters
Anderson family
Living people
NWA National Tag Team Champions
NWA/WCW World Television Champions
Professional wrestlers from Georgia (U.S. state)
Professional wrestling announcers
Professional wrestling managers and valets
Professional wrestling podcasters
Professional wrestling trainers
Sportspeople from Rome, Georgia
Stabbing survivors
The Dangerous Alliance members
The Four Horsemen (professional wrestling) members
The Heenan Family members
The Stud Stable members
WCW World Tag Team Champions
WWE Hall of Fame inductees